Orangeville/Rosehill Aerodrome  is located adjacent to Orangeville, Ontario Canada.

See also
 Orangeville/Brundle Field Aerodrome
 Orangeville/Castlewood Field Aerodrome
 Orangeville (Headwaters Healthecare Centre) Heliport
 Orangeville/Laurel Aerodrome

References

Registered aerodromes in Ontario
Transport in Orangeville, Ontario
Buildings and structures in Dufferin County